ISL Engineering College is affiliated to Osmania University, and is approved by the All India Council for Technical Education Estd: 2008, it is a private engineering college located in Hyderabad, Telangana. The college is run and maintained by the Ahmed Memorial Educational society. The college offers bachelor of engineering (B.E) in six courses and two masters Courses, namely Artificial Intelligence & Data Science, Civil Engineering, Computer Science and Engineering, Electronics and communication Engineering, Information technology & Mechanical engineering.

Courses offered

Admissions
For admission to the first year of the four-year degree course in Engineering, candidates must fulfill the eligibility requirements as prescribed by the Government of Telangana and the Osmania University. Since it is a Muslim minority college 75% of the seats are reserved for Muslims who appear and qualify in the state-level Engineering and Medical Common Entrance Test (EAMCET), The remaining 25% seats are filled by the College Management and NRI (Non-resident Indian) candidates. This allows Indian students who have studied abroad up to high school, and who might find it difficult to compete in the highly competitive entrance tests, to be able to study in the institution. The basis of admission is the successful completion of 10+2 years of school education for the NRI seats.

See also 
Education in India
Literacy in India
List of institutions of higher education in Telangana

References 

 Affiliated to Osmania University

External links 
 Official website
 Osmania University

Colleges in India
Engineering colleges in Hyderabad, India
Colleges affiliated to Osmania University
Educational institutions established in 2008
2008 establishments in Telangana